Apostasioideae is one of the five subfamilies recognised within the orchid family, Orchidaceae. Only two genera, Neuwiedia and Apostasia, and 15 species, are recognised within the Apostasioideae in contrast to the other orchid subfamilies which are highly species rich.

The Apostasioideae are generally considered a basal lineage within the orchids based on molecular data and flower structure. All other orchid subfamilies with the exception of the Cypripedioideae are monandrous (possessing a single stamen), however Apostasioid orchids have 3 stamens.

As with all basal or 'primitive' groups, extant species within Apostasioideae do not represent direct ancestors of the other subfamilies, they simply share the same common ancestor. However, by having followed a separate evolutionary pathway from the other orchids extant Apostasioid orchids may allow biologists to make inferences about features present in that common ancestor.

References

Bibliography
 Pridgeon, A.M.; Cribb, P.J.; Chase, M.W. & F. N. Rasmussen (1999): Genera Orchidacearum Vol.1, Oxford U. Press. 

 
Asparagales subfamilies